Tahmas Gavabar (also Romanized as Ţahmās Gavābar; also known as Tamās Gavābar) is a village in Amlash-e Jonubi Rural District, in the Central District of Amlash County, Gilan Province, Iran. At the 2006 census, its population was 69, in 23 families.

References 

Populated places in Amlash County